The 1985 Ole Miss Rebels football team represented the University of Mississippi in the sport of American football during the 1985 NCAA Division I-A football season.

Schedule

References

Ole Miss
Ole Miss Rebels football seasons
Ole Miss Rebels football